Sarah Travers (born 3 April 1974 in Belfast, Northern Ireland) is a journalist. In her seventeen years working for BBC Northern Ireland she was most recently a presenter for BBC Newsline until 2013.

Career
After attending Dominican College, Portstewart, Travers studied broadcast journalism at Nottingham Trent University. She began her broadcasting career while studying at Nottingham Trent, working at BBC Radio Nottingham and Central News. She joined BBC Radio Foyle in 1995 as a freelance reporter and news bulletin presenter and moved to the BBC newsroom in Belfast in 1997. In 2013, she ended her career as a reporter and presenter on BBC Newsline.

Soon after leaving the BBC, Travers hosted The Magazine, a UTV lifestyle programme launched in April 2013. The programme had Travers travel across Northern Ireland to interview celebrities and cover local human-interest stories. In December 2014, UTV announced that the show would not run for a third series.

Travers founded Bespoke Communications in 2015.

Personal life
Travers' father was English, and her grandfather moved to Coleraine to set up a textiles factory. Her mother moved from Cork, Ireland. In 2008, her father was diagnosed with Alzheimer's disease in 2008. Since his diagnosis, Travers has fronted campaigns to raise awareness of the disease. She is also a brand ambassador for the Alzheimer's Society. Her uncle died in the crash of Aer Lingus Flight 712 in 1968.

In 2009, Travers married journalist and author Stephen Price. As of 2003, they lived in Portstewart with their two children.

References

20th-century people from Northern Ireland
21st-century people from Northern Ireland
Alumni of Nottingham Trent University
Television presenters from Northern Ireland
Living people
1974 births
People educated at Dominican College, Portstewart
People from Portstewart
BBC newsreaders and journalists
BBC radio presenters